Trinity School may refer to:

Australia
Trinity College, Perth
Trinity Grammar School (New South Wales), Summer Hill
Trinity Grammar School Preparatory School, Strathfield
Trinity Grammar School (Victoria), Kew

Canada
Trinity College School, a boarding school in Port Hope, Ontario

Chile
, La Serena, Chile

United Kingdom
Trinity School, Belvedere, Bexley, London, England
Trinity School, Brentwood, Essex, England
Trinity School, Carlisle, Cumbria, England
Trinity School, Newbury, Berkshire, England
Trinity School, Nottingham, England
Trinity School, Teignmouth, Devon, England
Trinity School of John Whitgift, Croydon, London, England
Trinity Catholic School, Leamington Spa, England
Trinity Church of England High School, Manchester, England
Trinity Church of England School, Lewisham, London, England
Woodside High School, Wood Green, formerly known as Trinity Grammar School

United States
Trinity School (New York City), New York
Trinity School (Menlo Park), California
Trinity Schools, Inc.
Trinity School at Greenlawn, South Bend, Indiana
Trinity School at Meadow View, Falls Church, Virginia
Trinity School at River Ridge, Eagan, Minnesota
Trinity School for Children, a charter school in Tampa, Florida
Trinity School of Durham and Chapel Hill, Durham, North Carolina
Blessed Trinity Catholic High School, Roswell, Georgia
Trinity Episcopal Day School, Natchez, Mississippi
Trinity Preparatory School, Florida
Trinity Presbyterian School, Montgomery, Alabama
Trinity Valley School, Fort Worth, Texas

See also
 Trinity College (disambiguation)
 Trinity High School (disambiguation)
 Trinity University (disambiguation)
 Holy Trinity High School (disambiguation)
 Holy Trinity Catholic High School (disambiguation)
 Trinity Christian High School (disambiguation)